The 2023 Japanese Super Cup (known as Fujifilm Super Cup 2023 for sponsorship reasons) was the 30th Japanese Super Cup since its reestablishment, and the 38th overall. It was held on 11 February 2023 between the 2022 J1 League champions Yokohama F. Marinos and the 2022 Emperor's Cup winners Ventforet Kofu at the Japan National Stadium, Shinjuku, Tokyo. Both clubs were seeking their first Japanese Super Cup title.

Yokohama F. Marinos won their first Japanese Super Cup title at the seventh attempt after beating first-timer Ventforet Kofu 2–1.

Details

See also
2023 J1 League
2023 Emperor's Cup
2023 J.League Cup

References

External links
Official website 

Japanese Super Cup
Super
Yokohama F. Marinos matches

Japanese Super Cup
Japanese Super Cup